A vampire burial or anti-vampire burial is a burial performed in a way which was believed to prevent the deceased from revenance in the form of a vampire or to prevent an "actual" vampire from revenance. Traditions, known from the medieval times, varied.

By an association, the term "vampire burial" may also refer to burials apparently performed with rituals associated with beliefs that the buried may arise from the dead or evil spirits may come out of the grave, etc., and these rituals were intended to prevent this from happening. An example of this is believed to be the case of mid-5th century  "Children's Necropolis" of Lugnano in Teverina, Italy.

Archeologists uncovered a number of burials believed to be of this type.
 A mid-16th century burial of a woman on the island of Lazzaretto Nuovo in the Venice lagoon, Italy,
 Some interments in a cemetery in Greater Poland,   dated 1675–1880.
 Drawsko cemetery, Poland, dated to 17th-18th centuries However the theory about "vampire burials" there has been contested later.
 Gliwice, Poland, undated
 Medieval cemetery site in Kałdus, Poland
 A 17th century burial of a woman in a graveyard in Pień, Poland. The corpse had a padlock around the toe and a scythe positioned in such a way that if the corpse had risen from the grave, the scythe would have severed its throat.
 Anti-vampire burial from Sanok

See also

 Maschalismos

References

Burials
Vampirism
Corporeal undead